Pogobie may refer to the following places in Poland:

Pogobie Średnie
Pogobie Tylne